Aneta Kowalska (born 7 October 1982 in Warsaw, Poland) is a Polish former competitive pair skater. She previously skated with Artur Szeliski and with Łukasz Różycki.

Competitive highlights
2002 - Polish Nationals - 2nd
2001 - Junior Worlds - 17th
2001 - Golden Spin - 8th
1999 - Polish Nationals - 2nd (with Łukasz Różycki)
1999 - Junior Worlds - 17th (with Łukasz Różycki)

External links
 

1982 births
Living people
Polish female pair skaters
Figure skaters from Warsaw
21st-century Polish women